There are many $10 banknotes, bills or coins, including:
 Australian ten-dollar note
 Canadian ten-dollar note
 Nicaraguan ten-cordoba note
 United States ten-dollar bill
 Hong Kong ten-dollar note
 Hong Kong ten-dollar coin
 One of the Namibian dollars
 One of the banknotes of Zimbabwe

Other currencies that issue $10 banknotes, bills or coins are: